Lago di Calaita is a lake in Trentino, Italy. At an elevation of 1620 m, its surface area is 0.025 km².

The lake is included in the territory of the "Natural Park Paneveggio - Pale di San Martino".

References

Lakes of Trentino-Alto Adige/Südtirol